The Closed Chain is a 1920 German silent film directed by Paul L. Stein and starring Pola Negri, Aud Egede-Nissen, and Carl Ebert.

The film's sets were designed by the art director

Cast

References

Bibliography

External links

1920 films
Films of the Weimar Republic
German silent feature films
Films directed by Paul L. Stein
German black-and-white films
UFA GmbH films
1920s German films
Silent drama films
German drama films